This is a list of Honorary Fellows of Magdalene College, Cambridge.

 Simon Barrington-Ward
 Sir John Boardman
 Benjamin Britten
 Lida Lopes Cardozo Kindersley
 Chris von Christierson
 Sir David Clary
 Sir Colin Corness
 Robert Cripps
 Thomas Cripps
 Katie Derham
 Dame Carol Ann Duffy
 Derek Ezra, Baron Ezra
 Bamber Gascoigne
 Prince Richard, Duke of Gloucester
 Sir Christopher Greenwood
 Sir John Gurdon
 Brenda Hale, Baroness Hale of Richmond
 Thomas Hardy
 Seamus Heaney
 Sir David Hopwood
 David Hoyle
 Sir Antony Jay
 Sir Richard Jolly
 Igor Judge, Baron Judge
 Rudyard Kipling
 Kuok Khoon Hong
 Robert Latham
 Mark Malloch Brown, Baron Malloch-Brown
 Nelson Mandela
 Mark Davis Moorman (MPhil History and Philosophy of Science, Pepys Benefactor Fellow)
 Sir Andrew Morritt
 Denis Murphy
 Mike Newell
 Duncan Robinson
 Raymond Sackler
 Alexander Schultz
 Nazrin Shah of Perak
 John Simpson
 Sarah Springman
 Amy Tennant
 Sir John Tooley
 Helen Vendler
 Roger Vignoles
 The Lady Williams of Oystermouth
 Rowan Williams, Baron Williams of Oystermouth
 Wong Yan-lung

References

External links
 Honorary fellows

 
Magdalene College, Cambridge
Magdalene